A metroplex is a conurbation with more than one principal anchor city of near equal importance.

Metroplex may refer to:

Dallas–Fort Worth metroplex, a conurbation in Texas, U.S.
Eastgate Metroplex, a professional/retail complex in Tulsa, Oklahoma, U.S.
Metroplex (record label), a techno record label in Detroit, Michigan, U.S.
Metroplex (Transformers), the name of several characters in the Transformers franchise